The Diamond award certification in Argentina was established by the Argentine Chamber of Phonograms and Videograms Producers (CAPIF) in 1999, originally requiring sales of 500,000 copies. Albums released from 2001 onwards require 250,000 copies.

Until March 2005 CAPIF held a list of albums which received a Diamond award certification at the CAPIF website. CAPIF stopped holding a separate list, and now holds Diamond certifications together with all other certification.

List
Albums in the list are based on the newer CAPIF database except where otherwise noted.

References

Lists of best-selling albums
Music recording certifications